There have been six baronetcies created for persons with the surname Middleton, four in the Baronetage of England, one in the Baronetage of Great Britain and one in the Baronetage of the United Kingdom. One creation is extant as of 2008.
                 
The Middleton (or Myddleton) Baronetcy, of Ruthyn in the County of Denbigh, was created in the Baronetage of England on 22 October 1622 for Sir Hugh Middleton, 1st Baronet, Member of Parliament for Denbigh Boroughs. The second, third and fourth Baronets also represented Denbigh in the House of Commons. The title became dormant on the death of the sixth Baronet in circa 1757.

The Middleton Baronetcy, of Leighton Hall in the County of Lancaster, was created in the Baronetage of England on 24 June 1642 for George Middleton. The title became extinct on his death in 1673.

The Middleton Baronetcy, of Belsay Castle in the County of Northumberland, was created in the Baronetage of England on 24 October 1662 for William Middleton, of Belsay Castle, Belsay, Northumberland. The Middletons were descended from Richard Middleton who was Lord Chancellor to Henry III. His grandson Sir Gilbert Middleton took part in a rebellion against Edward II. He was captured and executed. The Middleton estates including Belsay were forfeited to the Crown but were restored to the family by marriage in the reign of Edward III. Sir John Middleton was a fervent Yorkist in the 15th century and fought at the Battles of St Albans in 1455 and Bosworth in 1485. The third, fifth and sixth Baronets all sat as Member of Parliament for Northumberland. The sixth Baronet assumed in 1799 by Royal sign-manual the surname of Monck in lieu of his patronymic, according to the will of his maternal grandfather Lawrence Monck. The seventh Baronet, who represented Durham in Parliament, resumed the use of the surname of Middleton. The title became extinct on the death of the tenth Baronet in 1999. The Middleton family and estate records are held in the archives of the Northumberland Record Office.

The Middleton Baronetcy, of Hackney in the County of Middlesex, was created in the Baronetage of England on 6 December 1681 for Hugh Middleton. The title became extinct on his death in 1702.

The Middleton, later Noel Baronetcy, of the Navy, was created in the Baronetage of Great Britain on 23 October 1781. For more information on this creation, which is still extant, see the Earl of Gainsborough.

The Middleton Baronetcy, of Crowfield, was created in the Baronetage of England on 12 May 1804 for William Middleton. The title became extinct on the death of the second Baronet in 1860.

Middleton baronets, of Ruthin, Denbighshire (1622)
 Sir Hugh Myddleton (or Middleton), 1st Baronet ( – 7 December 1631) MP for Denbigh 1604–11, 1614, 1621–22, 1624–25,1625, 1626 and 1628–29
 Sir William Middleton, 2nd Baronet (10 April 1603 – ) MP for Denbigh 1630 and 1647
 Sir Hugh Middleton, 3rd Baronet ( – 11 December 1675)
 Sir Hugh Middleton, 4th Baronet (6 April 1653 – 2 February 1701)
 Sir Hugh Middleton, 5th Baronet (died 16 November 1756)
 Sir Hugh Middleton, 6th Baronet (1 December 1723 – ) Dormant on his death

Middleton baronets, of Leighton Hall (1642)
Sir George Middleton, 1st Baronet (1600–1673)

Middleton baronets, of Belsay Castle, Northumberland (1662)
 Sir William Middleton, 1st Baronet (–1690)
 Sir John Middleton, 2nd Baronet (1678–1717)
 Sir William Middleton, 3rd Baronet (–1757), MP for Northumberland 1722–1757
 Sir John Lambert Middleton, 4th Baronet (1705–1768)
 Sir William Middleton, 5th Baronet (1738–1795), MP for Northumberland 1774–1795
 Sir Charles Miles Lambert Middleton, 6th Baronet (Monck from 11 February 1799) (1779–1867), MP for Northumberland 1812–20
 Sir Arthur Edward Monck, 7th Baronet (Middleton from 12 February 1876) (1838–1933), MP for Durham 1874–80
 Sir Charles Arthur Middleton, 8th Baronet (1873–1942)
 Sir Stephen Hugh Middleton, 9th Baronet (1909–1993)
 Sir Lawrence Monck Middleton, 10th Baronet (1912–1999), Extinct on his death

Middleton baronets, of Hackney (1681)
Sir Hugh Middleton, 1st Baronet (–1702)

Middleton, later Noel baronets, of the Navy (1781)
see the Earl of Gainsborough

Middleton baronets, of Crowfield (1804)

Sir William Fowle Middleton, 1st Baronet (1748–1829), MP
Sir William Fowle Middleton, 2nd Baronet (25 August 1784 – 2 May 1860) of Shrubland Hall

Gallery

See also
Myddelton baronets of Chirke, Denbighshire
Myddelton family

Notes

References 
Kidd, Charles, Williamson, David (editors). Debrett's Peerage and Baronetage (1990 edition). New York: St Martin's Press, 1990, 

Baronetcies in the Baronetage of Great Britain
Extinct baronetcies in the Baronetage of England
Extinct baronetcies in the Baronetage of the United Kingdom
Myddelton family